Lady Di is a diminutive of Lady Diana Spencer, later Princess of Wales (1961–1997).

Lady Di may also refer to:

People
 Lady Diana Beauclerk (1734–1808), otherwise known as "Lady Di", English noblewoman
 Dianne Walker, known as "Lady Di", American tap dancer
 Dianna Agron, nicknamed "Lady Di" in some media, American actress

Fictional characters
 Lady Diana Sartoris, in The Whip (play) (1909), deputy of the Beverly Hunt
 Lady Di (EastEnders), a pet bulldog in the BBC soap opera EastEnders
 Lady Di, in Sir Cumference books, wife of the title character
 Lady Di, in Carandiru (film) (2003), transwoman played by Rodrigo Santoro 
 Lady Di, in The Zero Hour (2010 film), played by Amanda Key

Music
 "Lady Di", composition by guitarist Jim Ferguson
 "Lady Di", second place song in Melodi Grand Prix 1982

Other
 Lady Di, a 1953 NZR DSA class locomotive, withdrawn in 1984
 The "Lady Di", a pink variant of the tricorne hat
 The "Lady Di", 1980s pageboy women's hairstyle

See also
 Di (disambiguation)
 Lady Dai or Xin Zhui (c. 217 BC–168 or 169 BC), Chinese noblewoman